The Gobernador Slope is a geographical region located in the northwestern portion of the U.S. state of New Mexico. It is near both Chacra Mesa and Chaco Canyon, which are noted for their Chacoan Anasazi ruins. The Chaco Slope is differentiated from the neighboring Chuska Valley, Chaco Core and Chaco Plateau by distinct surface water drainage patterns and geological formations. These regions were first labelled by archaeologist Gwinn Vivian.

The Gobernador Slope lies south of the San Juan Slope, which drains into the San Juan River. Its topography is dominated by rugged canyons that become deeper and narrower in the east. The Hogback and San Pedro Mountains border the slope in the east. Precipitation in the generally arid region rises with elevation.

Citations

References 
 .

Colorado Plateau